The Lost Ones is the English translation of Le Dépeupleur, a short story abandoned by Samuel Beckett in 1966 and completed in 1970.  The Lost Ones was published in French in 1970 and translated by the author in 1971. 

In remarkably dense but spare prose, Beckett describes a small world consisting of a flattened cylinder and its pitiable inhabitants. There is no plot, and Beckett frequently repeats certain phrases and bits of information. He abandoned the story in 1966 because of its "intractable complexities", and the basic idea was reused in "Bing" (1966, translated as "Ping"). Beckett wrote, "'Bing' may be regarded as the result or miniaturization of 'Le Dépeupleur'..." The story comes from a period where Beckett was implementing the architectural theories of Mies van der Rohe and Adolf Loos, who said that "ornament is a crime". This post-How It Is prose is largely fixated on the interior landscape of the mind. As Beckett noted in the typescript for Watt, "the unconscious mind! What a subject for a short story!".

Synopsis
"The Lost Ones" is set in an "abode where lost bodies roam each searching for its lost one". The abode is a flattened cylinder with rubber walls fifty meters in circumference and eighteen meters high. It is constantly illuminated by a dim, yellow light, and the temperature fluctuates between 5°C to 25°C, sometimes in as small an interval as four seconds. This leads to extremely parched skin, and the bodies brush against each other like dry leaves. Kisses make an "indescribable sound" and the rubber makes the footsteps mostly silent. There are 200 inhabitants, or one per square meter. Some are related to each other. Some are even married to each other, but the conditions make recognition difficult.

Spaced throughout the upper half of the cylinder are niches of varying size. Some are self-contained. Others are connected to each other by tunnels. The lost ones can climb into a niche by ladders which are distributed throughout the cylinder. The ladders are often missing rungs at irregular intervals. Most of the lost ones have an irrepressible desire to climb the ladders, and there are large queues around the base of each one, as the lost ones wait their turn to climb.

The cylinder has three separate, informal bands of activity. Around the periphery are the climbers waiting for their turns on the ladders. The periphery is also where the sedentary and vanquished lost ones prefer to lean against the wall, uninterested in searching or climbing anymore. As they are underfoot of the climbers, they are viewed as an annoyance. Just in from the outer band is a single-file line of lost ones who are weary of searching in the center of the sphere, where most of the lost ones reside.

Sex is an unlikely and rare occurrence due to the difficulties of achieving and maintaining an erection in the climate. When an erection does occur, it penetrates the "nearest tube". Given basic probability, the likelihood of man and wife uniting in such a way is extremely low. Because of the lack of floor space, no one ever lies down in the cylinder.

Adaptations
Beckett gave permission to Mabou Mines to stage The Lost Ones through the playwright Jean Reavey, who was a close friend of the author, on the condition that it was only a "straight reading". During rehearsals, the reading expanded into a fully realized production directed by Lee Breuer with David Warrilow performing the text in a dark, foam rubber cylindrical space with tiny HO scale plastic figures and ladders. The music was composed by Philip Glass.  Beckett later wrote to Reavey, "Sounds like a crooked straight reading to me."

In 2008, Sarah Kenderdine and Jeffrey Shaw created an art installation based on  The Lost Ones, which they called Unmakeablelove. They used motion capture technology to animate the characters in the short story. The audience are able to see the characters only through the use of virtual torches, which interact with the animations creating a mixed reality. Unmakeablelove has been exhibited at Le Volcan in Le Havre, the Shanghai Museum of Science and Technology, and the Hong Kong International Art Fair.

References

External links
Unmakeablelove

Short stories by Samuel Beckett
1970 short stories